The Equestrian Statue of Leopold II is a bronze equestrian statue erected in Brussels, Belgium, in memory of King Leopold II, second King of the Belgians. It was created by the sculptor Thomas Vinçotte in 1914, but it was not finalised until 1926 by the architect François Malfait, when it was inaugurated in honour of the king.

The statue stands on the /, to the south-east of the Royal Palace of Brussels, at the point where the / joins the / (Small Ring), and a few tens of metres from the Royal Stables of Brussels. It is also close to Matongé, an African (mainly Congolese) district of Ixelles. This area is served by Brussels Central Station, as well as by the metro stations Parc/Park (on lines 1 and 5) and Trône/Troon (on lines 2 and 6).

History

King Leopold II died in 1909, and as for many Kings of the Belgians, the Belgian authorities took the initiative, in 1914, to erect a statue in his honour. To do this, the Belgian State collected more than 625,000 Belgian francs. On 31 May 1914, the Belgian official journal and the press launched an appeal for anyone who wanted to contribute to erecting the statue. The initiative was successful, in which even Leopold's successor, King Albert I, himself took part and responded to the appeal along with some citizens.

The statue's construction, however, was delayed due to the First World War and it is necessary to wait until the end of the war for the work to be redesigned by the sculptor Thomas Vinçotte with the help of the architect François Malfait and the Union Minière du Haut-Katanga which, for its part, provided the raw material. The bronze statue was cast by the Compagnie des Bronzes de Bruxelles and was inaugurated on 15 November 1926, the feast day of the Dynasty, but also the patronal feast of Leopold II. This ceremony was marked by the presence of the entire Belgian Royal Family and the authorities who came in procession to the scene.

Controversies
Since the 21st century, the statue has aroused many controversies as to its presence in the centre of Brussels since the figure of Leopold II is no longer as admired and respected as at the time of its construction. Indeed, it is today mainly associated with Belgian colonial history and the Congo Free State, a territory over which Leopold exercised de facto sovereignty from 1885 to 1908.

The statue has been vandalised several times with red and white paint, including by the writer and activist Théophile de Giraud in 2008. In June 2020, a petition for its removal was signed over 45,000 times within several days. A majority in the Brussels Parliament wants to either recontextualise or remove all Leopold II statues in Brussels, including this one.

See also

 List of statues of Leopold II of Belgium
 History of Brussels
 Belgium in "the long nineteenth century"

References

Footnotes

Notes

Bibliography
 
 

Buildings and structures in Brussels
Tourist attractions in Brussels
City of Brussels
Statues in Belgium
Statues of monarchs
Bronze sculptures in Belgium
Monuments and memorials in Belgium